Gonda may refer to:

Places

India
 Gonda, Uttar Pradesh, a city in Uttar Pradesh
 Gonda district
 Gonda Junction railway station
 Gonda (Lok Sabha constituency)
 Gonda Assembly constituency
 Gonda, Aligarh, a town in Aligarh district, Uttar Pradesh
 Gonda, Raebareli, a village in Raebareli district, Uttar Pradesh

Elsewhere
 Gondā, a village in Iran
 Tang Gonda, a village in Iran
 Gondar, Ethiopia
 Gonda Building of the Mayo Clinic in Rochester, Minnesota

Name

Surname
Jan Gonda (1905–1991), Dutch orientalist and Indologist
János Gonda (born 1932), Hungarian jazz pianist
Ivett Gonda (born 1986), Hungarian-born Canadian taekwondo competitor
Leslie Gonda (1919–2018), Hungarian-born American businessman
Louis Gonda (born 1949/1950), American businessman (son of Leslie)
Michal Gonda (born 1982), Slovak association football player
Richard Gonda (born 1994), Slovak racing driver 
Shūichi Gonda (born 1989), Japanese association football player
Yasunosuke Gonda (1887–1951), Japanese sociologist and film theorist

Forename
 Gonda Van Steen (born 1964), Belgian-American classical scholar and linguist

Others
Gonda's sign, a clinical sign in medicine

See also
 Gondi (disambiguation)
 Gondia, a city in the state of Maharashtra in Central India